Mau Mau may refer to:

 The Kenya Land and Freedom Army, a Kenyan anti-colonial force
 The Mau Mau rebellion, uprising in Kenya in the 1950s
 Mau Mau Island or White Island, in the Brooklyn borough of New York City
 Mau Mau (game), a card game
 Gallery Mau Mau, an "art space" in Cape Town, South Africa
 The Mau Maus, a 1950s New York City street gang
 Mau Mau, a 1973 documentary film released as part of The Black Man's Land Trilogy

In music
 Mau Mau (band), an Italian music group
 The Mau-Mau's, an early punk band from Hollywood, California, United States
 Mau Maus, a fictional hip hop group in the 2000 film Bamboozled

See also 
 Mau (disambiguation)
 Maus (disambiguation)
 Radical Chic & Mau-Mauing the Flak Catchers, a 1970 book by Tom Wolfe
 Halemaʻumaʻu, a volcanic crater in Hawaii